Sam Gary (February 19, 1917 – July 20, 1986) was an American blues  and folk singer known for his collaboration with Josh White.

Born in Florida, Gary in the 1940s was a member of Josh White and His Carolinians and the Almanac Singers. In 1956, and as a soloist he was produced by Dean Gitter and with guitar accompaniment by Josh White, recorded an album for the British record label Esquire. One year later it was released in the U.S. on Tom Wilson's Transition Records.

External links
 Illustrated Sam Gary discography

1917 births
1986 deaths
American blues singers
American folk singers
20th-century African-American male singers